Spen Valley was a parliamentary constituency in the valley of the River Spen in the West Riding of Yorkshire.  It returned one Member of Parliament (MP)  to the House of Commons of the Parliament of the United Kingdom.

History

The constituency was created by the Redistribution of Seats Act 1885 for the 1885 general election, retained with altered boundaries in 1918, and abolished for the 1950 general election. In the 1901 Census, there were 13,557 inhabited houses in the division; there were 10,960 registered electors, of which 9,396 qualified by virtue of occupying property within the division, 1,490 by virtue of owning property, 67 by virtue of occupying land only within the division, and 7 qualifying as lodgers.

Political historian Henry Pelling noted that the constituency as it existed from 1885 to 1918 was dominated by the woollen industry and carpetmaking, where the vast bulk of the population were nonconformist: the Church of England parish of Birstall was said to have had only four clergymen in the eighteenth century (two of whom were schoolmasters). In 1922, membership of nonconformist circuits in the constituency is estimated at 2,759 for the Congregational Church, 1,065 Wesleyanism, 1,027 United Methodist Church, 698 Primitive Methodism, and 328 Baptists, making it the second largest nonconformist attendance in the West Riding.

The death of the sitting MP in 1919 led to a sensational by-election gain for the Labour Party, which was described by historian Maurice Cowling as the worst result for the Coalition during the 1918-22 Parliament; John Ramsden admitted that Labour's win had a big psychological impact on the Coalition but thought the result was a "freak win" given that Labour had under 40% of the vote. At the ensuing general election, the Manchester Guardian described the constituency as "scattered between the three towns of Leeds, Bradford and Huddersfield", centred on Cleckheaton, and populated by "woollen and wire workers, miners, card manufacturers". A significant presence of Irish voters was also noted. Sir John Simon, a former Home Secretary who had lost his seat in the 1918 election, regained the seat for the Liberals in 1922 and held it until given a Peerage in 1940. During this period Simon moved from declaring his basic sympathy with the Labour Party's objects, to forming the Liberal Nationals who went into alliance with the Conservatives. Simon found his constituency marginal, and had a majority of under 1,000 in his last election, and Labour gained it in the 1945 election landslide.

Boundary changes abolished the constituency in 1950. The bulk of the abolished constituency, including Cleckheaton, Gildersome and Spenborough, formed the eastern half of Brighouse and Spenborough; another large part including Gildersome, Birstall and Drighlington, formed part of Batley and Morley. Heckmondwike and Mirfield transferred to Dewsbury, while Kirkheaton moved to Colne Valley and other parts moved to Huddersfield East.

Boundaries
While originally devised by the Boundary Commissioners in 1885, the division was originally named as 'Birstal', "from the name of a large ancient parish". The naming of the new division led to a small struggle between the two Houses of Parliament during the passage of the Redistribution of Seats Act 1885, when Alfred Illingworth (Liberal MP for Bradford) moved an amendment to replace 'Birstal' with 'Spen Valley'. Illingworth argued that Birstall contained only one-eighth of the population of the division, but Spen Valley was a name which represented several important towns, and his amendment was accepted without dissent by the House of Commons. When the Bill reached the House of Lords, the Conservative peer the Earl of Feversham moved an amendment to reinstate 'Birstal' claiming the support of the people in the area. The Earl contended that the Spen Valley was an unknown description and "was only remarkable for being the receptacle of all the sewage from Birstal", whereas Birstal was a very important parish. He had support from the Earl of Cranbrook and his amendment was also accepted without dissent.

When the Bill returned to the House of Commons, Alfred Illingworth again took up the issue and moved that the Commons disagree with the Lords. He again pointed to the small population of Birstall in comparison with other towns, and noted that the Sanitary district covering the area was known as Spen Valley and that the River Spen ran through the centre of the constituency whereas Birstall was in the extreme north-east corner of it. Conservative MP Edward Stanhope (Mid Lincolnshire) said that he had found feeling in the area to be in favour of 'Birstal', but the President of the Local Government Board Sir Charles Dilke, speaking for the Government, stated that the local boards in Heckmondwike, Liversedge and Cleckheaton (where a majority of the population lived) had sent a memorial in favour of 'Spen Valley'. He agreed that the name had been invented by the Local Government Board, but argued that there were "local jealousies" between the towns and that Birstall was unpopular with the others, and therefore personally supported 'Spen Valley'. After a brief debate, the House voted by 65 to 46 to insist on 'Spen Valley' as the name. The Lords then gave way, but not without further protest from the Earl of Feversham.

During this battle no alteration was made to the boundary. The new division was to consist of:
the Parishes in the Sessional Division of Dewsbury of Gomersal, Heckmondwike and Liversedge, and
the Parishes of Cleckheaton, Clifton, Hartshead, and Wyke.

When redefined by the Boundary Commission in 1917, the county division was defined as consisting of the Urban Districts of Birkenshaw, Birstall, Drighlington, Gildersome, Heckmondwike, Hunsworth, Kirkheaton, Lepton, Mirfield, Spenborough and Whitley Upper.

The effect of the boundary change in 1918 was as shown in the table:

Of the 59,643 population in Spen Valley before the boundary change, 49,960 (83.8%) remained in the division after it. 6,145 (10.3%) moved to Bradford South while 3,538 (5.9%) moved to Elland. The new constituency was made up primarily of the old Spen Valley (65.3%), with 11,712 (15.3%) from Morley, 8,433 (11.0%) from Pudsey, and 6,450 (8.4%) from Holmfirth.

Members of Parliament

Elections

Note: Another General Election was required to take place before the end of 1915. The political parties had been making preparations for an election to take place and by the July 1914, the following candidates had been selected:

Liberal: Thomas Whittaker

Note: Another General Election was required to take place before the end of 1940. The political parties had been making preparations for an election to take place and by the Autumn of 1939, the following candidates had been selected:

Liberal National: William Woolley
Labour: Ivor Thomas

See also
 Spenborough

References

Parliamentary constituencies in Yorkshire and the Humber (historic)
Constituencies of the Parliament of the United Kingdom established in 1885
Constituencies of the Parliament of the United Kingdom disestablished in 1950
Politics of Kirklees